Villa Parisi - Borghese is a villa in Frascati, now in Monte Porzio Catone municipal territory, Italy.

Description and history

Villa Parisi was built between 1604 and 1605 by Mons. Fernando Taverna. In 1615 it was acquired by Cardinal Scipione Borghese. Later a nymphaeum and stately portal were built together as part of the extension work by the architect Girolamo Rainaldi.  Camillo Borghese in 1729 initiated further renovations.

Painted decorations was carried in the 18th century by painters Giuseppe Valeriani and his brother Domenico,  Ignazio Heldman and Taddeo Kuntze.  In 1896 the villa was purchased by Savero Parisi, an entrepreneur. In the garden are present Roman remains of an old Roman villa. It was the summer residence of Princess Pauline Bonaparte, wife of Camillo Borghese, and his family.

The villa is not open to the public. It was used as the primary location for the 1974 film Blood for Dracula starring Udo Kier. It was also used as the location for some of the scenes in the REDValentino campaign for 2016-2017, featuring the singer Birdy. It was used as the primary setting for the Italian zombie movie, Burial Ground: Nights of Terror (1981), and for the Netflix romantic comedy, Love Wedding Repeat (2020).

References

Sources

Wells Clara Louisa - The Alban Hills, Vol. I: Frascati - 1878 publisher: Barbera, Rome, Italy - OCLC 21996251
Villa Parisi: Legacy of Terror (2016), https://www.imdb.com/title/tt6222296/

Parisi
Buildings and structures in the Metropolitan City of Rome Capital
Houses completed in 1605
1605 establishments in the Papal States
1605 establishments in Italy